Julius Jacobsen (1915–1990) was a Danish composer.

Selected filmography
 Don't Give Up (1947)
 Woman Without a Face (1947)
 The Kiss on the Cruise (1950)
 Customs Officer Bom (1951)
 Uncle's (1955)
 The Biscuit (1956)
 Hello Baby (1976)

References

Bibliography
 Raphael Shargel, Ingmar Bergman: Interviews. Univ. Press of Mississippi, 2007.

External links

1915 births
1990 deaths
Danish composers
Danish emigrants to Sweden